    
This article lists the presidents of the Church of Jesus Christ of Latter-day Saints (LDS Church). The included persons have served as President of the Church and prophet, seer, and revelator of the LDS Church.

Timeline

See also
 Chronology of the First Presidency (LDS Church)
 Chronology of the Quorum of the Twelve Apostles (LDS Church)
 List of members of the Quorum of the Twelve Apostles (LDS Church)

Notes

References

List
Latter Day Saint movement lists
Presidents of the Church of Jesus Christ of Latter-day Saints